Jeffboat was a shipyard in Jeffersonville, Indiana founded by James Howard in 1834, a builder of steamboats. The company was owned by the Howard family until it was sold leading up to World War II. Following the war, it became known as the Jeffersonville Boat and Machine Company and later changed its name to Jeffboat, the more commonly used short form of its name. The company was the largest inland shipbuilder in the United States and the second-largest builder of barges before it closed in 2018.

Origin 
Jeffboat was originally established as the Howard Shipyards in 1834 by James Howard when he started his first boat, the Hyperion. The Howard family controlled the company for 107 years, building over 3,000 ships.

19th-century steamboats
The Joe Fowler is a former steamboat built at the Howard Shipyard in 1888. The sternwheeler was designed for packet service between Evansville, Indiana and Paducah, Kentucky. Joe Fowler was a United States Mail carrier, and after seven years of service, had logged over 327,000 miles and transported over 152,000 passengers without a fatal accident. In 1914, new owners replaced the steamer with high-pressure boilers designed for the western rivers. After this time, Joe Fowler ran excursions around the Pittsburgh and Wheeling, West Virginia areas, before hosting a cruise down the Ohio and Mississippi rivers for Mardi Gras in New Orleans, and a long summer cruise from Pittsburgh to St. Paul, then back to Louisville. After 1917, it was sold, refitted to better serve excursions, and renamed Crescent.

The Emily is a former sternwheeled steamboat built at the Howard Shipyard in 1891. The single-boiler steamer began in ferry service at Kenova, West Virginia, and later operated at Wheeling, West Virginia. Emily was sold three times, starting in 1902. The third buyer was Henderson Ferry Company of Henderson, Kentucky, which renamed it the Dixie Bee Line. It burned in Henderson in 1926. After a rebuild, it ran as the ferry Ohio No. 2. In the 1930s, it was renovated for packet service, and renamed Joe Curtis, and plied the waters near Memphis until it struck ice and sunk on January 25, 1940.

20th century 

Besides the original Jeffersonville, In. location the company had also established Yards in Paducah, Kentucky, Madison, Indiana, Cincinnati, and other locations. Most of them were put up for sale in 1917.

The company faced persistent challenges during the Great Depression. The United States Navy bought the shipyards in 1942 and reorganized it as the Jeffersonville Boat & Machine Company. 

During World War II, it built 123 vessels of the type known as "Landing Ship, Tank" (LSTs), 23 submarine chasers, and numerous other craft.  Post-war, the shipyards built customized crafts, but specialized in barges and towboats. In 1957, the official name was changed to Jeffboat.

The Jeffboat yard built two nostalgic paddlewheelers during this period. In 1973, it completed Mississippi Queen steamboat, and in 1985, finished the General Jackson showboat.

Production was stopped from 1986 to 1989.

21st century
A wildcat strike shut down operations during part of 2001.

The Jeffboat yard built a third nostalgic paddlewheeler, the City of Evansville, which was put into service as the Casino Aztar riverboat casino.

A union decertification petition was circulated in 2016, but employees voted 649 to 190 to retain Teamsters Local 89 as their union.

As of 20 June 2015, the 68-acre Jeffboat shipyard is owned by American Commercial Lines Inc. (ACL), a company also based in Jeffersonville, Indiana. Mark Knoy is the CEO. In turn, Platinum Equity owns ACL, the largest inland shipbuilder in the United States, building both river barges and ocean barges.

The company laid off 278 employees in November 2017 due to a lack of production, and it closed permanently on April 23, 2018.

Ships built
Steamships built in the yard include (in alphabetical order):

See also
 Howard Steamboat Museum

References

External links

 
 
 
 Official IBT Local 89 website
 

Shipbuilding companies of the United States
Companies based in Indiana
Jeffersonville, Indiana
Steamboats of the Ohio River
Manufacturing companies established in 1834
American companies established in 1834
1834 establishments in Indiana
2018 disestablishments in Indiana